Willie Charles Young (November 12, 1947 – September 3, 2008) was an American professional football player who was an offensive tackle for three seasons in the National Football League (NFL) with the Buffalo Bills and Miami Dolphins. He played college football at Alcorn State University and attended Brinkley High School in Jackson, Mississippi. He was also a member of the Edmonton Eskimos of the Canadian Football League.

References

External links
Just Sports Stats

1947 births
2008 deaths
Players of American football from Mississippi
American football offensive tackles
Canadian football offensive linemen
American players of Canadian football
Alcorn State Braves football players
Edmonton Elks players
Buffalo Bills players
Miami Dolphins players
People from Jefferson County, Mississippi